Bishop Kelly High School is a private Roman Catholic secondary school in Boise, Idaho, operated by the Diocese of Boise. One of two Catholic high school in the state of Idaho, its school colors are black and gold and the mascot is a knight.

History
Bishop Kelly High School was established in the fall of 1964, succeeding St. Teresa's Academy, which had closed that spring.

St. Teresa's Academy was Boise's first high school, private or public, established in 1890 by the Sisters of the Holy Cross as a high school and boarding school for young women. Later, St. Joseph's School was built to offer Catholic education to the young men of the area, with an elementary school occupying the lower level and a high school on the upper floor.

In 1933, the two high schools joined to form the co-educational St. Teresa's Academy, which educated both Catholic and non-Catholic students until its closure in 1964. Boise's public high school was established in 1902.

Namesake
The school is named for Edward Joseph Kelly (1890–1956), the third Bishop of Boise and the first native of the Pacific Northwest to be appointed a bishop. Born in The Dalles, Oregon, he was ordained in 1917 and became Bishop of Boise at age 38 in 1928. Kelly served 28 years as bishop, until his death at age 66.

Athletics
The Bishop Kelly Knights field 32 athletic teams and compete in IHSAA Class 4A in the Southern Idaho Conference (4A).

State titles
Boys
Football (6): fall (A-2, now 3A) 1994; (4A) 2004, 2005, 2010, 2013, 2014, 2015 (official with introduction of A-2 playoffs, fall 1978)
Cross Country (5): fall (B, now 4A) 1985; (4A) 2001, 2005, 2008, 2022
Basketball (2): (A-2, now 3A) 1991, 1998
Baseball (6): (A-2, now 3A) 1995, 2000, (4A) 2008, 2010, 2021, 2022 (IHSAA does not sponsor a state baseball tournament; does not keep records)
Soccer (2): (A-2, now 3A) 1996, (4A) 2021
Track (10): (A-2, now 3A) 1976, 1981; (4A) 2002, 2005, 2006, 2007, 2016, 2017, 2018, 2021, 2022
Golf (12): (Class B, now 3A) 1969, 1970, 1971, 1994, 1996; (A-2, now 3A) 1998, 1999; (4A) 2003, 2004, 2005, 2010, 2017, 2022
Tennis (2): (4A) 2014, 2021 (combined team until 2008, see below)
Lacrosse (1):  2011 (club sport, records not kept by IHSAA)
Swimming (3): 2017, 2019, 2021 (introduced in 2017)

Girls
Cross Country (12): fall (3A) 1998, 1999; (4A) 2001, 2003, 2004, 2005, 2006, 2007, 2009, 2010, 2011, 2018 (introduced in 1974)
Soccer (9): fall (A-1, now 5A) 2001; (4A) 2007, 2008, 2010, 2011, 2012, 2016, 2017, 2018 (introduced in 2000)
Basketball (1): 2013
Track (7): (A-2, now 3A) 1994, 1999, 2000; (4A) 2004, 2010, 2012, 2021(introduced in 1971)
Softball (11): (A-2, now 3A) 1997, 1998, 1999; (4A) 2001, 2003, 2005, 2006, 2007, 2013, 2015 , 2019, 2021, 2022 (introduced in 1997)
Golf (10): (Class B, now 3A) 1992, 1995; (4A) 2001, 2005, 2006, 2007, 2008, 2012, 2013, 2014 (introduced in 1987)
Swimming (2): 2017, 2021 (introduced in 2017)
Tennis (3): 2019, 2021, 2022 (combined team until 2008, see below)

Combined
Tennis (17): (Class B, now 3A) 1972, 1975, 1977, 1978, 1979, 1980, 1983, 1984, 1995, 1998, 1999, 2000; (4A) 2001, 2004, 2005, 2006, 2007 (combined until 2008)
Hockey (2): 2014, 2021(club sport; players from other schools as well as BK compete on the Boise Knights team, which uses BK logos and colors)
Band (1): 2016
Speech (1): 2021
Debate (6): (one classification) 2008, 2010, 2011; (small-school division) 2017, 2021, 2022
Cheerleading (1): 2011 (non-stunt division; division discontinued in 2013)

Notable alumni
Butch Otter, Governor of Idaho (2007-2019)      - Class of 1962 (St. Teresa's)
Michael Kirk, award-winning documentary filmmaker, Frontline - Class of 1965
Ben Ysursa, Idaho Secretary of State - Class of 1967
William Petersen, CSI actor/producer - Class of 1972
David Bieter, Mayor of Boise (2004-2019) - Class of 1978
Mike Luckovich, editorial cartoonist - Class of 1978
Max Butler, former security consultant and online hacker; arrested for the theft of over 2 million credit card numbers. - Class of 1990
Nick Symmonds, runner, Olympian - Class of 2002
Cody Hawkins, Colorado Buffaloes quarterback (2006–10) - Class of 2006
Josh Osich, MLB pitcher (2015–present), Oregon State (2008–11) - Class of 2007
Benito Skinner, actor and comedian

References

External links

Catholic Idaho.org - schools - Diocese of Boise
MaxPreps.com - Bishop Kelly Knights

Catholic secondary schools in Idaho
Roman Catholic Diocese of Boise
Educational institutions established in 1964
Treasure Valley
High schools in Boise, Idaho
Schools accredited by the Northwest Accreditation Commission
1964 establishments in Idaho